Events from the year 1948 in Canada.

Incumbents

Crown 
 Monarch – George VI

Federal government 
 Governor General – the Viscount Alexander of Tunis
 Prime Minister – William Lyon Mackenzie King (until November 15) then Louis St. Laurent
 Chief Justice – Thibaudeau Rinfret (Quebec) 
 Parliament – 20th

Provincial governments

Lieutenant governors 
Lieutenant Governor of Alberta – John C. Bowen   
Lieutenant Governor of British Columbia – Charles Arthur Banks 
Lieutenant Governor of Manitoba – Roland Fairbairn McWilliams  
Lieutenant Governor of New Brunswick – David Laurence MacLaren 
Lieutenant Governor of Nova Scotia – John Alexander Douglas McCurdy 
Lieutenant Governor of Ontario – Ray Lawson 
Lieutenant Governor of Prince Edward Island – Joseph Alphonsus Bernard 
Lieutenant Governor of Quebec – Eugène Fiset 
Lieutenant Governor of Saskatchewan – Reginald John Marsden Parker (until March 23) then John Michael Uhrich (from March 24)

Premiers 
Premier of Alberta – Ernest Manning   
Premier of British Columbia – Boss Johnson  
Premier of Manitoba – Stuart Garson (until November 13) then Douglas Campbell 
Premier of New Brunswick – John McNair 
Premier of Nova Scotia – Angus Macdonald 
Premier of Ontario – George A. Drew (until October 19) then Thomas Laird Kennedy 
Premier of Prince Edward Island – J. Walter Jones  
Premier of Quebec – Maurice Duplessis 
Premier of Saskatchewan – Tommy Douglas

Territorial governments

Commissioners 
 Commissioner of Yukon – John Edward Gibben 
 Commissioner of Northwest Territories – Hugh Llewellyn Keenleyside

Events
June 7 – Ontario election: George Drew's PCs win a second consecutive majority
June 24 – Saskatchewan election: Tommy Douglas's Co-operative Commonwealth Federation wins a second consecutive majority
July 22 – A second runoff referendum is held in the 1948 Newfoundland referendums; confederation with Canada is approved, leading to the eventual union between Canada and the Dominion of Newfoundland in March 1949.
August 17 – Alberta election: Ernest Manning's Social Credit Party wins a fourth consecutive majority
September 6 – The oil well Atlantic No. 3 (near Devon, Alberta), which had been running wild since March 21, catches fire. Smoke affects the atmosphere for hundreds of kilometres until the blaze is put out in November by a team led by Myron M. Kinley and Red Adair.
October 19 – Thomas Kennedy becomes premier of Ontario, replacing George Drew
November 13 – Douglas Campbell becomes premier of Manitoba, replacing Stuart Garson
November 15 – Louis Saint Laurent becomes prime minister, replacing Mackenzie King

Arts and literature

Awards
See 1948 Governor General's Awards for a complete list of winners and finalists for those awards.
Stephen Leacock Award: Paul Hiebert, Sarah Binks

Sport 
February 2 – Barbara Ann Scott becomes the first Canadian to win the figure skating gold medal at the 1948 Winter Olympics in St. Moritz, Switzerland
April 14 – The Toronto Maple Leafs win their seventh Stanley Cup by defeating the Detroit Red Wings 4 games to 0.
April 30 – The Thunder Bay Junior Hockey League's Port Arthur West End Bruins win their only Memorial Cup by defeating the Ontario Hockey Association's Barrie Flyers 4 games to 0. All games were played at Maple Leaf Gardens in Toronto
November 27 – The undefeated  Calgary Stampeders win their first Grey Cup by defeating the Ottawa Rough Riders 12 to 7 in the 36th Grey Cup played at Varsity Stadium in Toronto. This Cup is notable for the Stampeders' fans making a party out of the game and launching the Grey Cup festival that precedes the championship game.

Births

January to March

January 10 – Craig Russell, female impersonator (d. 1990)
January 12 – Gordon Campbell, politician and 34th Premier of British Columbia
January 13 – Pat O'Brien, politician
January 15 – Andy Jones, comedian, writer, actor and director
January 16 – Cliff Thorburn, snooker player, former world number one

January 19 – Frank McKenna, businessman, politician, 27th Premier of New Brunswick and diplomat
January 25 – Sarkis Assadourian, politician
February 11 – Shaughnessy Cohen, politician (d. 1998)
February 13 – Allan Legere, serial killer, rapist, and arsonist
February 21 – Chuck Cadman, politician (d. 2005)
March 14
Pierre Granche, sculptor (d. 1997)
Maria Minna, politician
March 20 – Bobby Orr, ice hockey player
March 31 – Gary Doer, politician and 20th Premier of Manitoba

April to June
April 14 – Claude Vivier, composer
April 16 – Reg Alcock, politician, minister, MP for Winnipeg South (1993–2006); President of the Treasury Board (2003–2006) (d. 2011)
April 17 – Wilf Wedmann, high jumper
April 20 – Rémy Trudel, academic and politician
May 11 – John Plohman, politician
May 16 – Clif Evans, politician
May 24 – Lorna Crozier, poet and essayist
June 4
 Margaret Gibson, novelist and short story writer (d. 2006)
 Sandra Post, golfer, first Canadian to play on the LPGA Tour
June 5 – Bill Smart, middle-distance runner and judge
June 7 – Welwyn Wilton Katz, children's author

July to September

July 4 – Katherine Govier, novelist
July 8 – Raffi, children's entertainer, music producer, author and entrepreneur
August 2 – Bob Rae, politician and 21st Premier of Ontario
August 5 – Don Scott, politician
August 31 – Marie-Lynn Hammond, folk singer-songwriter, broadcaster and playwright
September 8 – Stephen Owen, politician
September 10 – Margaret Trudeau, wife of the late Pierre Trudeau, the 15th Prime Minister of Canada
September 14 – John Edzerza, Yukon MLA (d. 2011)
September 19 – James McCrae, politician
September 21 – Bernard Jean, oboist, conductor, and music educator
September 24 – Phil Hartman, actor, comedian, screenwriter and graphic artist (d. 1998)

October to December
October 8 – Pat Binns, politician, 30th Premier of Prince Edward Island and diplomat
October 9 – Brad Woodside, politician, Mayor of Fredericton, New Brunswick
October 17 – Margot Kidder, actress (d. 2018)
November 5 – Mike Neary, rower
November 24 – Spider Robinson, science fiction author
December 7 – Jay Dahlgren, javelin thrower
December 30 – Rick Casson, politician
December 30 – Pierre Blais, jurist, politician and Minister
December 31 – René Robert, ice hockey player (d. 2021)

Full date unknown
Marc Lortie, diplomat

Deaths
March 14 – Ernest Frederick Armstrong, politician (b. 1878)
March 28 – John Duncan MacLean, teacher, physician, politician and Premier of British Columbia (b. 1873)
May 20 – George Beurling, most successful Canadian fighter pilot of World War II (b. 1921)
May 21 – James Ralston, lawyer, soldier, politician and Minister (b. 1881)

Full date unknown
Margaret C. MacDonald, nurse (b. 1873)

See also
 List of Canadian films

Historical documents
"A common standard of achievement for all peoples and all nations" - UN proclaims Universal Declaration of Human Rights

Parliamentary committee studying draft UN human rights declaration speaks to global variety of rights interpretations

UN convention on genocide defines it as attempt to destroy group by killing or seriously harming members, preventing births or taking group's children

Canadian children "had no idea what to do with us" - Holocaust orphan arrives in Canada and settles in Regina

"Fitting together the scattered jigsaw-puzzle pieces of their lives" - Japanese Canadians move on, and why they have to

CPR sleeping car porter enjoys travel but finds job "subservient" and travelling public "about 85 pleasant and the other 15 unpleasant"

Ottawa-Quebec politics rule out Black U.S. troops in Quebec, where their presence "might be misunderstood and misrepresented"

"Maximum dramatic appeal" and "simplicity" of secret U.S.A.-Canada free-trade proposal encourage optimism for success

Lester Pearson says "the world needs the textiles which Japan" would produce if it received Most favoured nation trade status

Ambassador to China keen to see Canadian presence (banks, Canadian Pacific ships and planes, TCA and Navy) in southeast Asia

U.S.A. to hold multi-party talks on North Atlantic security matters, including Soviet intentions and U.S. commitment

Canada wants North Atlantic security organization to involve foreign ministry consultation and economic and social collaboration

Kinks in Canada-U.S. joint defence arrangements, including roles, responsibilities and functions, need to be worked out

Canada seeks to know U.S. policy on partition of Palestine, especially regarding possibility of UN Security Council authorizing force

Cabinet decides not to support UN membership for Israel before it recognizes Israel's provisional government

With Nationalist forces "off balance and low in morale" in Chinese Civil War, Canada plans evacuations

South African ambassador seeks Canada's support for white supremacy policy to block communism and Indians "swamping" whites

Cabinet seeks better ways to exclude from Canada top leaders of "unions known to be communist dominated" and fellow travellers

Cabinet Defence Committee sees need for Arctic icebreaker to support government stations and wartime amphibious operations

"Frenzied," "shrill" and "a pitch of hysteria which could scarcely be raised" - anti-U.S. Soviet propaganda assessed

Given CBC cooperation and with policy "guidance notes," Pearson ponders propaganda broadcasts to communist controlled countries

Newfoundland must be independent because England couldn't help if it wanted to and confederation means federal government rule

"I fear the return of Responsible Government" - Newfoundlander dreads days of privation recurring if Canada is rejected

Refus Global calls Quebeckers to free themselves from past fears and anguish at nauseating recent evils with passion and unity

CBC Radio interview with figure skating champion Barbara Ann Scott after she won gold medal at Winter Olympics in St. Moritz

Photo: Calgary Stampeders' Norman L. Kwong runs into opposing team's defence in football game

Kate Aitken talks about women of the year, including Princess Elizabeth, Barbara Ann Scott and Henrietta Banting, on her radio show

CBC radio play from "series of dramatized programmes on human relation" involving National Committee for Mental Hygiene of Canada

"Absolute and undying ambition to succeed" - CBC network announcer Elwood Glover's memories of his early radio career

Ducks Unlimited naturalist says prairie drought can seem catastrophic, but only cover 1% of waterfowl breeding territory

Illustration: Promotional poster, with illustration by Peter Maxwell Ewart, invites hunters to travel on Canadian Pacific

References

 
Years of the 20th century in Canada
Canada
1948 in North America